Darboy may refer to

 Darboy, Wisconsin, an unincorporated community 
 Georges Darboy (1813–1871) French Catholic priest, archbishop of Paris